Hannemann, or variant Hanneman, is a surname.

People with the surname Hannemann
 Dirk Hannemann (born 1970), German footballer
 Felix Hanemann (born 1953), American singer and musician
 Hans-Joachim Hannemann (1915–1989), German rower
 Inge Hannemann (born 1968), German blogger
 Jacob Hannemann (born 1991), American baseball player
 Johann Ludwig Hannemann (1640–1724), professor of medicine
 Karl Hannemann (1895–1953), German film actor
 Micah Hannemann (born 1994), American football player
 Mufi Hannemann (born 1954), American politician
 Nephi Hannemann, Samoan-American actor and singer
 Paul Hanneman (1936 – 2017), American politician and member of the Oregon House of Representatives
 Raik Hannemann (born 1968), German swimmer
 René Hannemann (born 1968), German bobsledder

People with the surname Hanneman 
 Adriaen Hanneman (c. 1603-1671), a Dutch Golden Age painter
 Charles Bennett "Chuck" Hanneman (1914 –1999), American football player
 Craig Hanneman (born 1949), American football player
 Jeffrey John Hanneman (1964 – 2013), American founding member of the metal band Slayer 
 Logan Hanneman (born 1993), American cross-country skier
 Reese Hanneman (born 1989), American cross-country skier
 Tom Hanneman, American sport reporter, announcer and analyst

See also 
 Hahnemann
 Hanne
 Hahne
 Hahn (disambiguation)

German-language surnames
Patronymic surnames